In the mining industry or extractive metallurgy, beneficiation is any process that improves (benefits) the economic value of the ore by removing the gangue minerals, which results in a higher grade product (ore concentrate) and a waste stream (tailings). There are many different types of beneficiation, with each step furthering the concentration of the original ore.

History 
Iron beneficiation has been evident since as early as 800 BC in China with the use of bloomery. A bloomery is the original form of smelting and allowed people to make fires hot enough to melt oxides into a liquid that separates from the iron. Although the bloomery was promptly phased out by the invention of the blast furnace, it was still heavily relied on in Africa and Europe until the early part of the second millennium. The blast furnace was the next step in smelting iron which produced pig iron. The first blast furnaces in Europe appeared in the early 1200s around Sweden and Belgium, and not until the late 1400s in England.  The pig iron poured from a blast furnace is high in carbon making it hard and brittle, making it hard to work with. In 1856 the Bessemer process was invented that turns the brittle pig iron into steel, a more malleable metal. Since then, many different technologies have been invented to replace the Bessemer process such as the electric arc furnace, basic oxygen steelmaking, and direct reduced iron (DRI).

For sulfide ores, a different process is taken for beneficiation. The ore needs to have the sulfur removed before smelting can begin. Roasting is the primary method of separating, where wood was placed on heaps of ore and set on fire to help with oxidation.

2 Cu2S + 3 O2 → 2 Cu2O + 2 SO2

The earliest practices of roasting were done outside, allowing large clouds of sulfur dioxide to blow over the land causing serious harm to surrounding ecosystems, both aquatic and terrestrial. The clouds of sulfur dioxide combined with local deforestation for wood needed for roasting compounded damages to the environment, as seen in Sudbury, Ontario and the Inco Superstack.

Types of separation

Disaggregation 
Beneficiation can begin within the mine itself. Most mines will have a crusher within the mine itself where separation of ore and gangue minerals occurs and as a side effect becomes easier to transport. After the crusher the ore will go through a grinder or a mill to get the ore into fine particles. Dense media separation (DMS) is used to further separate the desired ore from rocks and gangue minerals. This will stratify the crushed aggregate by density making separation easier. Where the DMS occurs in the process can be important, the grinders or mills will process much less waste rock if the DMS occurs beforehand. This will lower wear on the equipment as well as operating costs since there is a lower volume being put through.

Physical separation 
After the milling stage the ore can be further separated from the rock. One way this can be achieved is by using the physical properties of the ore to separate it from the rest of the rock. These processes are gravity separation, flotation, and magnetic separation. Gravity separation uses centrifugal forces and specific gravity of ores and gangue to separate them. Magnetic separation is used to separate magnetic gangue from the desired ore, or conversely to remove a magnetic target ore from nonmagnetic gangue. DMS is also considered a physical separation.

Chemical separation 
Some ore physical properties can not be relied on for separation, therefore chemical processes are used to separate the ores from the rock. Froth flotation, leaching, and electrowinning are the most common types of chemical separation. Froth flotation uses hydrophobic and hydrophilic properties to separate the ore from the gangue. Hydrophobic particles will rise to the top of the solution to be skimmed off. Changes to pH in the solution can influence what particles will be hydrophilic. Leaching works by dissolving the desired ore into solution from the rock. Electrowinning is not a primary method of separation, but is required to get the ore out of solution after leaching.

Case examples 
In the case of gold, after adsorbing onto carbon, it is put into a sodium hydroxide and cyanide solution. In the solution the gold is pulled out of the carbon and into the solution. The gold ions are removed from solution at steel wool cathodes from electrowinning. The gold then goes off to be smelted.

Lithium is hard to separate from gangue due to similarities in the minerals. In order to separate the lithium both physical and chemical separation techniques are used. First froth flotation is used. Due to similarities in mineralogy there is not complete separation after flotation. The gangue that is found with lithium after the flotation are often iron bearing. The float concentrate goes through magnetic separation to remove the magnetic gangue from the nonmagnetic lithium.

See also
 Coal preparation plant
 Refining (metallurgy)
 Taconite

References

Further reading

 
 
 
 

Waste treatment technology
Metallurgical processes